Hungary has competed in every IAAF World Championships in Athletics, since the first edition in 1983, winning 14 podiums, including 7 silver medals and 7 bronze medals.

Athletics
All Hungarian medals till Doha 2019.

Medal tables

By championships

By type

By athlete

Only athletes with more than two medals

See also 
Hungary at the IAAF World Indoor Championships in Athletics
Hungary at the European Athletics Championships
Hungary at the European Athletics Indoor Championships

References

External links
 Official site of the Hungarian Athletics Association  

 
Hungary
World Championships in Athletics